Juan Castañón de Mena (10 April 1903 – 27 April 1982) was a Spanish general who served as Minister of the Army of Spain between 1969 and 1973, during the Francoist dictatorship.

References

1903 births
1982 deaths
Defence ministers of Spain
Government ministers during the Francoist dictatorship